Q48 may refer to:
 Q48 (New York City bus)
 Al-Fath, a surah of the Quran